Freier may refer to:

People
Adam Freier (born 1980), Australian rugby footballer, son of Laurie
Laurie Freier, Australian rugby footballer and coach
Paul Freier (born 1979), German footballer
Philip Freier, 13th Archbishop of Melbourne, Australia
Rachel Freier (born 1965), Civil Court judge in New York
Recha Freier (1892-1984), founder of the Youth Aliyah organisation
Shalheveth Freier (1920–1995), World War II soldier
Tom Freier, American politician

Music
Freier Fall, Christina Stürmer's debut album

See also
Frier
Freer (disambiguation)